Alf Marholm (1918–2006) was a German actor.

Partial filmography

 Turtledove General Delivery (1952) - Benno Perlitz, Zeichner
 No Way Back (1953) - Direktor Berger
 Die goldene Pest (1954)
 Viele kamen vorbei (1956) - Kreitz
 Von der Liebe besiegt (1956) - Richter
 Die Freundin meines Mannes (1957) - Modefachmann
 Schwarze Nylons - Heiße Nächte (1958) - Ricardo
 Lockvogel der Nacht (1959) - Albert Zanecki
 The Death Ship (1959) - Kapitän der Yorikke
 The Crimson Circle (1960) - Gefängnisdirektor (uncredited)
 The Terrible People (1960) - Richard Cravel
  (1962, TV Mini-Series) - Inspektor Rowland
 Il terrore dei mantelli rossi (1963)
 Coffin from Hong Kong (1964) - Mr. Belling (voice, uncredited)
 Geissel des Fleisches (1965) - Verteidiger (voice, uncredited)
 Kiss Kiss, Kill Kill (1966) - O'Brien (voice, uncredited)
 The Stuff That Dreams Are Made Of (1972) - Kriminalrat Hering (uncredited)
 Tears of Blood (1972) - Vater Täumer
 All People Will Be Brothers (1973) - Delacorte
 Only the Wind Knows the Answer (1974) - Heinrich Hellmann (uncredited)
  (1976) - Bongartz
 Son of Hitler (1979) - Judge
 Kolping (1986)
 Zurivý reportér (1987) - Jan Teply
 Lovec senzací (1989) - Séfredaktor

References

External links
 

1918 births
2006 deaths
German male film actors
German male television actors
20th-century German male actors
People from Oberhausen